Lethrinops leptodon is a species of cichlid endemic to Lake Malawi where it prefers areas with sandy substrates.  This species grows to a length of  TL.  It can also be found in the aquarium trade.

References

Lethrinops
Taxa named by Charles Tate Regan
Fish described in 1922
Taxonomy articles created by Polbot